Nils Frithiof Holmgren (1877–1954) was a Swedish zoologist and comparative anatomist. He was professor of zoology at Stockholm University from 1921 to 1944.

In 1906 Holmgren defended his doctoral dissertation at Stockholm University. In 1912 he became a teacher there, and in 1919 assistant professor of zoology, and in 1921 full professor. In later work he focused on the structure of the brain in worms, arthropods and vertebrates, publishing  (1916)  (Comparative anatomy of the brain),  (1919),  (1920), Points of view concerning forebrain morphology in lower vertebrates (1922), (with C. J. van der Horst) Contribution to the morphology of the brain in Ceratodus (1925), and Points of view concerning forebrain morphology in higher vertebrates (1925). This work made him a world expert on the nervous systems of the lower vertebrates. Later work focused on the investigation of cartilage in lower vertebrates. Holmgren, who undertook a research trip to Bolivia and Peru in 1904–1905, was from 1920 the publisher of the journal Acta Zoologica. Holmgren was elected a member of the Royal Swedish Academy of Sciences in 1928.

References

1877 births
1954 deaths
20th-century Swedish zoologists
19th-century Swedish zoologists
Academic staff of Stockholm University
Members of the Royal Swedish Academy of Sciences
Burials at Norra begravningsplatsen